The Big Apple Bash is an album by jazz pianist Jay McShann recorded in 1978 and released by the Atlantic label.

Reception

The Allmusic review by Scott Yanow noted "On this excellent release, McShann appears with two groups of all-stars. ... The unusual grouping of swing, bop and modern stylists is successful ".

Track listing
 "Crazy Legs and Friday Strut" (Jay McShann) – 7:48
 "Georgia on My Mind" (Hoagy Carmichael, Stuart Gorrell) – 7:52
 "Dickie's Dream" (Count Basie, Lester Young) – 6:03
 "Ain't Misbehavin'" (Fats Waller, Harry Brooks, Andy Razaf) – 5:09
 "I'd Rather Drink Muddy Water" (Eddie Miller) – 4:43
 "Blue Feeling" (Duke Ellington) – 5:12
 "Jumpin' the Blues" (McShann, Charlie Parker) – 7:12

Personnel
Jay McShann - piano, vocals
Doc Cheatham – trumpet (tracks 3, 4, 6 & 7)
Dickie Wells – trombone (tracks 3, 4, 6 & 7)
Herbie Mann – flute, tenor saxophone (tracks 1-4, 6 & 7)
Earle Warren – alto saxophone (tracks 3, 4, 6 & 7)
Gerry Mulligan – baritone saxophone, soprano saxophone (tracks 1 & 2)
John Scofield – guitar
Eddie Gómez (tracks 3, 4, 6 & 7), Jack Six (tracks 1 & 2) - bass
Connie Kay (tracks 3, 4, 6 & 7), Joe Morello (tracks 1 & 2)  - drums
Sammy Figueroa – percussion (track 1)
Janis Siegel – vocals (track 4)

References

1979 albums
Jay McShann albums
Atlantic Records albums